Circles is the eighth studio album by pioneering jazz group Soil & "Pimp" Sessions, from Japan. It was released on August 7, 2013.

Track listing

Additional personnel
Tim Conley aka MAST - Guitar on Track 8 "記憶の旅 (Kioku no Tavi)"

References

2013 albums
Soil & "Pimp" Sessions albums